Pseudophilautus dayawansai (Dayawansa's shrub frog) is a species of frog in the family Rhacophoridae, endemic to Sri Lanka.

Its natural habitats are wet lowland forests of Sri Lanka. It is threatened by habitat loss. It is one of the 8 species of rhacophorids that was discovered from Adam's Peak recently.

Etymology
The frog was named after Dr. Nihal Dayawansa, a senior lecturer in zoology in University of Colombo.

Description
This species can easily identified by yellow patches on eyes, snout and sides of the body. Three black rings on forehead and dorsum is brownish in color.

References

dayawansai
Endemic fauna of Sri Lanka
Frogs of Sri Lanka
Amphibians described in 2013